Alberto Sergio Cattaneo (26 June 1967 in Milan) is an Italian mathematician and mathematical physicist, specializing in geometry related to quantum field theory and string theory.

Biography
After attending Liceo scientifico A. Volta in Milan, Cattaneo studied physics at University of Milan, graduating in 1991. In 1995 he obtained a PhD in theoretical physics at the same university; his thesis, entitled Teorie topologiche di tipo BF ed invarianti dei nodi (Topological BF theories and knot invariants), was supervised by Maurizio Martellini.

Cattaneo worked as a postdoc in 1995-1997 at Harvard University (with Arthur Jaffe) and in 1997-1998 at University of Milan (with Paolo Cotta-Ramusino). In 1998 he moved to University of Zurich's mathematics department as assistant professor and he become full professor in 2003.

In 2006 he was an invited speaker, with the talk From topological field theory to deformation quantization and reduction, at the International Congress of Mathematicians in Madrid. Cattaneo was elected a Fellow of the American Mathematical Society in 2013.

Research 
Cattaneo's research interests include deformation quantization, symplectic and Poisson geometry, topological quantum field theories, and the mathematical aspects of perturbative quantization of gauge theories.

With Giovanni Felder he developed a path integral interpretation of the deformation quantization of Poisson manifolds (introduced in 2003 by Maxim Kontsevich), as well as a description of the symplectic groupoid integrating a Poisson manifold as an infinite-dimensional symplectic quotient.

He supervised 14 PhD students as of 2022.

Selected publications

Articles

Books
 with Alain Bruguières, Bernhard Keller, Charles Torossian:

as editor

References

External links
 
 
 
 
 

20th-century Italian mathematicians
21st-century Italian mathematicians
20th-century Italian physicists
21st-century Italian physicists
Mathematical physicists
University of Milan alumni
Academic staff of ETH Zurich
Fellows of the American Mathematical Society
1967 births
Living people